Peter Griesar (born 1969) is an American musician, known for playing keyboards, harmonica and providing backing vocals with the Dave Matthews Band from August 1990 to March 1993. He grew up in Westchester County, New York and moved to Charlottesville, Virginia to attend the University of Virginia. He met Dave Matthews, later joining his band. After leaving the band in 1993, he continued playing, releasing several solo albums.

Dave Matthews Band
While living in Charlottesville, he got a job at a bar called Miller's. Starting out as a waiter he became friends with a bartender, Dave Matthews.

Griesar was recruited to join the band The Basics, by bassist Houston Ross. LeRoi Moore and Tim Reynolds were also in the group. As a result, he began recording his own music with Matthews. When Matthews quit bartending, they started playing shows at another bar called Eastern Standard.

In August 1990, Miller's hosted practice sessions for Matthews, Moore, Carter Beauford, and Stefan Lessard, while they were closed for late summer cleaning. Before long, he was practising with them.

By 1991, the band (entertaining using the name Dumela) became the Dave Matthews Band, and added violinist Boyd Tinsley, playing at fraternity houses and other bars. During the fall of 1992, as attendance was skyrocketing, the band began their plans to release their first album, while touring sat the same time.

Departure from Dave Matthews Band
Due to the almost constant touring with Dave Matthews Band for three years and, owing to his mother's failing health, Griesar left the band after the band's March 23, 1993 show, preferring to play at smaller venues and theatres, as opposed to arenas that the band began to play.

Two years later, in 1995, he returned to music, working with artist Lauren Hoffman. In 1996, he joined The Ninth, which included Lessard. The band did not take off, so Griesar decided to record his own album for his relatives.

Supertanker
In 1998, he assembled Supertanker, and released a solo album, Disposable Love Songs. Two years later, he left the original Supertanker, and released an EP, From the Supertanker Dude with the Zero Obsession. In August 2000, he assembled the second incarnation of Supertanker, which toured briefly.

In 2002 Griesar released a solo album on Offset Records called Superfastgo that also featured performances by DMB saxophonist LeRoi Moore, guitarist Tim Reynolds and pianist Art Wheeler. The album was received well by critics, including a favorable write up in Rolling Stone, and received heavy college airplay. Griesar immediately followed this up with another album called Candyshop released in 2003.

References

External links
Peter Griesar interview with Nancies.org

1969 births
American rock keyboardists
Dave Matthews Band members
Living people
Musicians from New York (state)
Musicians from Virginia